Anna Børve Jenssen (born 26 September 1975) is a Norwegian journalist and a former chief editor of Morgenbladet.

Career
Jenssen graduated from Norsk Journalisthøgskole in 2002. She worked for the newspaper Morgenbladet from 2002, and for Dagens Næringsliv from 2006 to 2012. She was co-editor of the anthology Nesten! in 2004. She was appointed chief editor of Morgenbladet in 2012, taking over from Alf van der Hagen, and resigned as editor in October 2019 after internal conflics.

References 

1975 births
Living people
Norwegian newspaper editors
Norwegian women editors
Morgenbladet people